The Desktop Developers' Conference was a Linux conference where developers discussed and worked on X11, Linux desktops like GNOME and KDE, FreeDesktop.org projects, and desktop software such as web browsers, office suites, and groupware. The conference took place in Ottawa, Ontario, Canada each year — just before the Linux Symposium conference — in 2004, 2005, and 2006.

The Desktop Developers' Conference has not been held since 2006.

References

Further reading

Free-software conferences
Linux conferences